Chinese Theological Review is an English-language journal of Protestantism in China. It is mainly made up of essays, sermons, and official statements of the Three-Self Patriotic Movement and the China Christian Council, translated from Chinese. Since 1985, the journal has been edited by Janice Wickeri and published by the Foundation for Theological Education in South East Asia.

References

External links 
 
 Indexed by the Centre for the Study of Christianity in Asia of Trinity Theological College, Singapore, by author and by year

Christianity studies journals
Publications established in 1985